Guibare is a department or commune of Bam Province in north-western Burkina Faso. Its capital lies at the town of Guibare. According to the 1996 census the department has a total population of 22,510.

Towns and villages
Guibare
Barsa
Bokin
Gougré
Karentenga
Koundoula
Sakoudi
Niangouèla
Sindri
Vousnango
Tontenga
Wattinoma
Yilou

References

Departments of Burkina Faso
Bam Province